Discocalyx megacarpa (Chamorro: otot) is a species of plant in the family Primulaceae. It is endemic to Guam and the islands of Rota and Saipan within the Commonwealth of the Northern Mariana Islands. It is an understorey shrub, growing to 2 m tall, with lanceolate green leaves, paniculate, cream-coloured, unisexual flowers, and globose, red fruits each containing a single large ribbed seed.

References

Primulaceae
Flora of the Mariana Islands
Taxa named by Elmer Drew Merrill